Amphotropism or amphotropic indicates that a pathogen like a virus or a bacterium has a wide host range and can infect more than one species or cell culture line.

See also
 Tropism, a list of tropisms
 Ecotropism, indicating a narrow host range

Ecology terminology